Elections to East Ayrshire Council took place on 4 May 2017 on the same day as the 31 other Scottish local government elections. For the second consecutive election, the Scottish National Party (SNP) were returned as the largest party with 14 seats but remained shy of an overall majority. Labour lost further ground but were again returned as the second-largest party with nine seats. The Conservatives made several gains to return six councillors while The Rubbish Party – standing in their first election – won their first seat. Two independent candidates were also elected.

The SNP took over control of the council as a minority administration having previously run the council in coalition with the Conservatives following the previous election in 2012.

Election result

Source: 

Note: "Votes" are the first preference votes. The net gain/loss and percentage changes relate to the result of the previous Scottish local elections on 3 May 2012. This may differ from other published sources showing gain/loss relative to seats held at dissolution of Scotland's councils.

Seats changing hands

Ward summary

|- class="unsortable" align="centre"
!rowspan="2" style="text-align:left;"|Ward
!%
!Cllrs
!%
!Cllrs
!%
!Cllrs
!%
!Cllrs
!%
!Cllrs
!%
!Cllrs
!%
!Cllrs
!rowspan=2|TotalCllrs
|- class="unsortable" style="text-align:center;"
!colspan=2|SNP
!colspan=2|Labour
!colspan=2|Conservative
!colspan=2|Rubbish
!colspan=2|Green
!colspan=2|Libertarian
!colspan=2|Independents
|-
|align="left"|Annick
|32.32
|1
|13.51
|1
|bgcolor="lightblue"|36.77
|bgcolor="lightblue"|1
|colspan=2 
|4.42
|0
|0.11
|0
|12.83
|1
|4
|-
|align="left"|Kilmarnock North
|bgcolor="#efe146"|49.79
|bgcolor="#efe146"|1
|23.13
|1
|25.96
|1
|colspan=2 
|colspan=2 
|1.09
|0
|colspan=2 
|3
|-
|align="left"|Kilmarnock West and Crosshouse
|bgcolor="#efe146"|40.59
|bgcolor="#efe146"|2
|23.49
|1
|31.27
|1
|colspan=2 
|3.84
|0
|1.09
|0
|colspan=2 
|4
|-
|align="left"|Kilmarnock East and Hurlford
|bgcolor="#efe146"|45.14
|bgcolor="#efe146"|2
|26.35
|1
|21.6
|1
|colspan=2 
|colspan=2 
|0.78
|0
|6.1
|0
|4
|-
|align="left"|Kilmarnock South
|bgcolor="#efe146"|54.65
|bgcolor="#efe146"|2
|32.89
|1
|11.71
|0
|colspan=2 
|colspan=2 
|0.73
|0
|colspan=2 
|3
|-
|align="left"|Irvine Valley
|bgcolor="#efe146"|36.29
|bgcolor="#efe146"|1
|16.75
|1
|19.88
|0
|16.94
|1
|colspan=2 
|0.3
|0
|9.8
|0
|3
|-
|align="left"|Ballochmyle
|bgcolor="#efe146"|30.96
|bgcolor="#efe146"|2
|28.87
|1
|20.1
|1
|colspan=2 
|colspan=2 
|0.32
|0
|13.22
|0
|4
|-
|align="left"|Cumnock and New Cumnock
|30.74
|2
|bgcolor="#eea2ad"|35.27
|bgcolor="#eea2ad"|1
|22.21
|1
|colspan=2 
|2.84
|0
|0.6
|0
|8.31
|0
|4
|-
|align="left"|Doon Valley
|25.16
|1
|bgcolor="#eea2ad"|34.06
|bgcolor="#eea2ad"|1
|18.33
|0
|colspan=2 
|1.39
|0
|0.1
|0
|20.92
|1
|3
|- class="unsortable"
!align="left"|Total
!38.54
!14
!25.15
!9
!18.75
!6
!1.88
!1
!1.62
!0
!0.52
!0
!8.95
!2
!32
|}

Ward results

Annick
Following the Fifth Statutory Review of Electoral Arrangements, Annick was increased from a three-member ward to a four-member ward. The SNP, Labour and independent candidate Ellen Freel retained the seats they had won at the previous election while the Conservatives won the extra seat.

Kilmarnock North
Labour retained their only seat while the SNP retained one of their two seats and the Conservatives gained one seat from the SNP.

Kilmarnock West and Crosshouse
The SNP (2), Labour and the Conservatives retained the seats they had won at the previous election.

Kilmarnock East and Hurlford
The SNP retained both the seats they had won at the previous election while Labour retained one of their two seats and the Conservatives gained one seat from Labour.

Kilmarnock South
The SNP (2) and Labour retained the seats they had won at the previous election.

Irvine Valley
Following the Fifth Statutory Reviews of Electoral Arrangements, Irvine Valley was reduced in size from a four-member ward to a three-member ward. The SNP retained one of the two seats they had won at the previous election while Labour retained their only seat. The Conservatives lost their only seat and the Rubbish Party won a council seat for the first time.

Ballochmyle
The SNP retained both the seats they had won at the previous election while Labour retained one of their two seats and the Conservatives gained one seat from Labour.

Cumnock and New Cumnock
Labour retained one of the three seats they won at the previous election while the SNP retained their only seat and both the SNP and the Conservatives gained one seat from Labour.

Doon Valley
The SNP retained their only seat while Labour retained one of their two seats and independent candidate Drew Filson gained a seat from Labour.

Notes

References

2017 Scottish local elections
2017